Kereka Island is a mostly ice-covered island in the Pitt group of Biscoe Islands, Antarctica.  It is 1.75 km long in southeast-northwest direction and 580 m wide, and is separated from neighbouring Slumkey Island to the west-southwest by an 80 m wide passage.

The island is named after the settlement of Kereka in Northern Bulgaria.

Location
British mapping in 1971.

Maps
 British Antarctic Territory: Graham Coast.  Scale 1:200000 topographic map.  DOS 610 Series, Sheet W 65 64.  Directorate of Overseas Surveys, UK, 1971.
 Antarctic Digital Database (ADD). Scale 1:250000 topographic map of Antarctica. Scientific Committee on Antarctic Research (SCAR). Since 1993, regularly upgraded and updated.

References
 Bulgarian Antarctic Gazetteer. Antarctic Place-names Commission. (details in Bulgarian, basic data in English)
 Kereka Island. SCAR Composite Antarctic Gazetteer.

External links
 Kereka Island. Copernix satellite image

Islands of the Biscoe Islands
Bulgaria and the Antarctic